Rebecca Brandewyne née Wadsworth (born March 4, 1955, in Knoxville, Tennessee, United States) is an American bestselling writer of romance novels. Brandewyne has been published in multiple languages in over 60 countries.

Biography

Personal life
Born Mary Rebecca Wadsworth on March 4, 1955, in Knoxville, Tennessee, United States, to a large family, Brandewyne grew up in Kansas. She has a sister. She married Gary Brock, and had a son, Shane Brock, then divorced. She married an Englishman, John Cox, from whom she is now divorced. She now lives with her son.

In August 2006, a Kansas trial court ordered self-publishing company AuthorHouse to pay $240,000 in punitive damage as well as $230,000 in actual damage to Brandewyne and her parents for publishing a book by her ex-husband that was "harmful" and libelous of them. AuthorHouse was also ordered to pay $20,000 each to Brandewyne's parents for the damage. Although the court acknowledged that AuthorHouse employed a business model that placed a degree of responsibility for the content of works upon the authors, in this case they found that AuthorHouse had failed to act when it was informed that the book might include libelous content.

Brandewyne has a Bachelors in Journalism, with minors in history and music, and a Masters in Communication.

Writing career
Brandewyne has written over thirty consecutive bestselling titles. She has won numerous awards form Affaire de Coeur and Romantic Times magazines. Brandewyne has been named one of Love's Leading Ladies and has been inducted into Romantic Times BOOKreviews Hall of Fame.

Bibliography

Single novels
No Gentle Love (1980)
Forever My Love (1982)
Rose of Rapture (1984)
The Outlaw Hearts (1986)
Desire in Disguise (1987)
Heartland (1990)
Rainbow's End (1991)
Desperado (1992)
Swan Road (1994)
The Jacaranda Tree (1995)
Wildcat (1995)
Dust Devil (1996)
Presumed Guilty (1996)
Hired Husband (1996)
Glory Seekers (1997)
The Lioness Tamer (1998)
High Stakes (1999)
Destiny's Daughter (2001)
The Love Knot (2003)
To Die For (2003)
The Ninefold Key (2004)
The Crystal Rose (2006)
From the Mists of Wolf Creek (2009)

Aguilar's Fate
Love Cherish Me (1983)
And Gold Was Ours (1984)

Chandlers of Highclyffe Hall
Upon a Moon Dark Moor (1988)
Across a Starlit Sea (1989)

Chronicles of Tintagel
Passion Moon Rising (1988)
Beyond the Starlit Frost (1991)

Omnibus in collaboration
Bewitching Love Stories (1992) (with Shannon Drake, Kasey Michaels and Christina Skye)
Night Magic (1993) (with Shannon Drake, Jill Gregory and Becky Lee Weyrich)
Abduction and Seduction (1995) (with Joan Johnston and Diana Palmer)
New Year's Resolution: Husband (1995) (with Carla Neggers and Anne Stuart)
A Spring Bouquet (1996) (with Jo Beverley, Janet Dailey and Debbie Macomber)
The Bounty / A Little Texas Two-Step (2002) (with Peggy Moreland)
Winter Nights (2002) (with Ginna Gray, Joan Hohl and Ann Major)
Love Is Murder (2003) (with Maureen Child and Linda Winstead Jones)
At the Edge (2003) (with Merline Lovelace and Elizabeth Lowell)
Hired Husband / Millionaire and the Cowgirl (2008) (with Lisa Jackson)

References and sources

1955 births
Living people
American women novelists
American romantic fiction writers
Novelists from Tennessee
20th-century American novelists
21st-century American novelists
Women romantic fiction writers
20th-century American women writers
21st-century American women writers